The Secrets of Wu Sin is a 1932 American Pre-Code mystery film directed by Richard Thorpe and starring Lois Wilson, Grant Withers and Dorothy Revier. It was made by the Poverty Row studio Chesterfield Pictures.

Main cast
 Lois Wilson as Nona Gould  
 Grant Withers as James Manning 
 Dorothy Revier as Margaret King  
 Robert Warwick as Roger King  
 Tetsu Komai as Wu Sin  
 Toshia Mori as Miao Lin  
 Richard Loo as Charlie San  
 Luke Chan as Luke  
 James Wang as Pete

References

Bibliography
 Pitts, Michael R. Poverty Row Studios, 1929-1940. McFarland & Company, 2005.

External links
 

1932 films
1932 mystery films
1930s English-language films
American mystery films
Films directed by Richard Thorpe
American black-and-white films
Chesterfield Pictures films
1930s American films